Víctor Contreras (born 27 August 1941) is a Mexican former field hockey player who competed in the 1972 Summer Olympics.

References

External links
 

1941 births
Living people
Mexican male field hockey players
Olympic field hockey players of Mexico
Field hockey players at the 1972 Summer Olympics